Hong Kong Sign Language (香港手語), or HKSL, is the deaf sign language of Hong Kong and Macau. It derived from the southern dialect of Chinese Sign Language, but is now an independent, mutually unintelligible language.

Origins
The origin of HKSL can be traced back to around 1949, when a group of around 20 deaf people moved from Shanghai and Nanjing to Hong Kong and began tutoring the local deaf community to facilitate greater social cohesion and standardisation of their sign language(s). Chinese sign language was the initial medium of instruction, leading to the circulation of CSL among the local deaf community, who adapted the language by developing their own signs with new ideas, concepts or things they encounter in their lives. This led to a further development of the vocabulary and intricacies of Hong Kong Sign Language as separate from CSL. 
For a number of years, HKSL continued to develop with little external influence, as international travel from Hong Kong and thus interaction between other deaf communities was not always feasible. 
With more and more Hong Kong deaf people travelling abroad in recent decades for a variety of reasons, borrowings into HKSL have become more common. The American manual alphabet was borrowed and adopted (with some adaptations) in this way, as were many other signs.

Grammar and vocabulary

There are 40 to 50 basic hand-shapes in Hong Kong sign language. Signs are generally derived from conceptual representation (abstract, such as the signs for 'father' and 'mother'), visual representation (direct, such as the signs for 'to separate' and 'thick-skinned') or representation of the Chinese character (such as with the signs for 'to introduce' and 'the Chinese language') or - rarely - the English term (such as with the sign for 'toilet/WC'). Question words are generally phrase or sentence-final, while the basic word order is S-O-V. It is worth noting that the subject and object may be omitted in conversation between two people where they are clear from context.

Sometimes, signers may speak or mouth the word while signing. For example, when signing the name of a place like Central, the signer may mouth the Cantonese name for "Central" while signing. This practice may be related to the signers' past training in speech and lip-reading, but sometimes mouthing bears no relation to the spoken language, and is an inherent part of the sign.

HKSL is interesting among sign languages in that it is entirely ambidextrous.

References

External links
Chinese Sign Language: by Elizabeth T. Yeh, 10/28/04
Centre for Sign Linguistics and Deaf Studies, Chinese University of Hong Kong
Hong Kong Sign Language Browser
Hong Kong Sign Language Association
Hong Kong Society for the Deaf
Silence
Then & Now: Sign Language in Hong Kong by Jason Wordie
Sign Bilingualism and Deaf Education in Hong Kong
ELAR archive of Preliminary Documentation of Macau Sign Language

Sign languages of China
Languages of Hong Kong
Languages of Macau